Peter Tendai Cousins (born 3 March 1981 in Harlow) is a British judoka, who competed at the Olympic Games.

Judo career
Cousins came to prominence after becoming champion of Great Britain, winning the middleweight division at the British Judo Championships in 1999. He then followed this up by winning three consecutive British titles in 2001, 2002 and 2003.

Two years later in 2005, he won a fifth British title before securing a bronze medal at the 2006 European Judo Championships, in Tampere. One year later in 2007, he won a silver medal at the 2007 World Judo Championships in Rio de Janeiro. He lost the gold medal match against the home judoka Luciano Corrêa. The performance inevitably resulted in selection for Great Britain at the 2008 Summer Olympics in Beijing. He competed in the half-heavyweight category and was eliminated in the first round. At this heavier weight he won two more British titles in 2008 and 2012.

Achievements

Personal life
His twin brother Thomas Cousins is also a British judoka, who competed at the Commonwealth Games.

References

External links
 

1981 births
Living people
Sportspeople from Harlow
British male judoka
Olympic judoka of Great Britain
Judoka at the 2008 Summer Olympics
Black British sportsmen